Middletown was a town in Richmond County, New York. It was incorporated in 1860 from parts of Southfield and Castleton. At the time, it included the most populous part of the village of Edgewater and the hilly ridges of the interior, Grymes Hill and Todt Hill among others.

It was dissolved in 1898 upon consolidation into the City of New York.

See also
 List of Staten Island neighborhoods
 List of former municipalities in New York City

References

Geography of Staten Island
History of Staten Island
Former towns in New York City